Monochamus grandis is a species of beetle in the family Cerambycidae. It was described by Waterhouse in 1881. It is known from Japan.

References

grandis
Beetles described in 1881